Chinmaya Vidyalaya, Kozhikode is a higher secondary school managed by Chinmaya Vidyalaya group of schools. It is located in Thondayad,  from Kozhikode city (also known as Calicut), Kerala, India. The school educates students from kindergarten to 12th standard and is operated by the Chinmaya Mission Trust. The language of instruction is English.

See also
Educational institutions in Kozhikode

References

External links
 Official site

Schools in Kozhikode
Schools affiliated with the Chinmaya Mission
High schools and secondary schools in Kerala
Private schools in Kerala